Jonathan Matías Urretaviscaya da Luz (born 19 March 1990) is a Uruguayan professional footballer who plays for Club Atlético River Plate (Montevideo) as a right winger.

Club career
Born in Montevideo to a father of Basque descent, Urretaviscaya started off his career with hometown's Club Atlético River Plate. His Primera División debut came one month shy of his 18th birthday as he scored in a 2–0 win against Liverpool Montevideo in the Clausuras first game, and he eventually netted nine goals overall for the runners-up.

Urretaviscaya signed a contract with Portuguese club S.L. Benfica on 2 July 2008, for a fee of €1.5 million, being rarely used in his debut season. In January 2010, after having made almost no official appearances during the campaign – his only Primeira Liga game was against FC Porto as his team had many players missing due to injuries and suspensions, and he put up a good performance in a 1–0 home win for the eventual champions– he was loaned to Peñarol for five months, thus returning to his country.

In late June 2010, Urretaviscaya was loaned to Deportivo de La Coruña in a season-long move. In the following transfer window, however, he returned to Peñarol in the same situation.

For 2011–12, Urretaviscaya returned to Portugal, being loaned to Vitória S.C. while also renewing his contract until 2015. He went on to miss most of the campaign, due to injury.

Subsequently, returned to the Estádio da Luz, Urretaviscaya spent the better part of the following two seasons with the B team. On 1 September 2014 he terminated his contract with Benfica and penned a one-year deal with F.C. Paços de Ferreira.

Urretaviscaya re-joined Peñarol for a third spell on 23 January 2015, after signing for six months. He was on the move again the following June, joining C.F. Pachuca in the Mexican Liga MX.

International career
Urretaviscaya was part of the Uruguayan squad that competed in the 2012 Summer Olympics, held in London. He earned his first cap for the full side on 28 March 2017: after having come on as a second-half substitute for Carlos Sánchez, he received two yellow cards in 11 minutes and was thus sent off, in a 1–2 away loss to Peru for the 2018 FIFA World Cup qualifiers.

On 2 June 2018, Urretaviscaya was selected for the finals in Russia by manager Óscar Tabárez. He made his debut in the competition on 6 July, playing 17 minutes in the 2–0 quarter-final defeat against France after replacing Nahitan Nández.

Career statistics
Club

International

HonoursBenficaPrimeira Liga: 2009–10
Taça da Liga: 2009–10
UEFA Europa League runner-up: 2012–13PeñarolUruguayan Primera División: 2009–10
Copa Libertadores runner-up: 2011PachucaLiga MX: Clausura 2016
CONCACAF Champions League: 2016–17MonterreyLiga MX: Apertura 2019
CONCACAF Champions League: 2019Individual'
FIFA Club World Cup: Bronze Ball 2017

References

External links

National team data 

1990 births
Living people
Uruguayan people of Basque descent
Uruguayan footballers
Footballers from Montevideo
Association football wingers
Uruguayan Primera División players
Club Atlético River Plate (Montevideo) players
Peñarol players
C.A. Rentistas players
Primeira Liga players
Liga Portugal 2 players
S.L. Benfica footballers
Vitória S.C. players
S.L. Benfica B players
F.C. Paços de Ferreira players
La Liga players
Deportivo de La Coruña players
Liga MX players
C.F. Pachuca players
C.F. Monterrey players
Uruguay youth international footballers
Uruguay under-20 international footballers
Uruguay international footballers
2018 FIFA World Cup players
Olympic footballers of Uruguay
Footballers at the 2012 Summer Olympics
Uruguayan expatriate footballers
Expatriate footballers in Portugal
Expatriate footballers in Spain
Expatriate footballers in Mexico
Uruguayan expatriate sportspeople in Portugal
Uruguayan expatriate sportspeople in Spain
Uruguayan expatriate sportspeople in Mexico